Saoi O'Connor is an Irish climate activist, who began the Fridays for Future strike in Cork, Ireland in January 2019.

Climate justice activism
Saoi O'Connor began the Fridays For Future strike in Cork City on 11 January 2019 outside Cork City Hall holding a poster which says "The Emperor Has No Clothes". O'Connor started their activism aged 3, as part of a fair trade campaign during St Patrick's Day. O'Connor moved away from mainstream education at Skibbereen Community School to continue their studies home-schooling to allow them to work full time on climate justice activism full-time. In February 2019, O'Connor travelled to the European Parliament in Strasbourg to join fellow activists for the climate debates.

O'Connor was one of the 157 delegates to the 2019 RTÉ Youth Assembly on Climate, and attended the United Nations Climate Change Conference in Madrid the same year. In December 2019, O'Connor was awarded the Outstanding Individual at the Cork Environmental Forum's Awards ceremony. During the ceremony, they remarked on how little had changed regarding climate change policy since they began their climate strike. The Fridays For Future Cork group, of which O'Connor was a member, also received a commendation from the Forum.

Due to the COVID-19 pandemic, the in-person school strikes were suspended in early 2020, but O'Connor recommenced them in July 2020. In December 2020 O'Connor was part of a global group of 9 women and non-binary activists that published a letter to global leaders on Thomson Reuters Foundation News, entitled "As the Paris Agreement on Climate Change marks five years, urgent action on climate threats is needed now". The international group included Mitzi Jonelle Tan, Belyndar Rikimani, Leonie Bremer, Laura Muñoz,  Fatou Jeng, Disha Ravi, Hilda Flavia Nakabuye and Sofía Hernández Salazar.

O'Connor wrote an article for The Irish Times in January 2021 reflecting on the difficulties of preparing for the Leaving Certificate examinations during the pandemic. O'Connor was one of the contributors to an anthology, Empty House, co-edited by Alice Kinsella and Nessa O'Mahony and included contributions from Rick O'Shea and Paula Meehan. For Earth Day 2021, O'Connor was one of the organisers for Fridays For Future Ireland's virtual event, which called on the Minister for Climate Action Eamon Ryan to take more and immediate action on climate change.

O'Connor was engaged in grassroots activism during the COP26 meeting in Glasgow in 2021. They stated that "None of these conferences can give us what we’re fighting for, only the people can do that.". For Earth Day 2021, O'Connor was one of the organisers for Fridays For Future Ireland's virtual event, which called on the Minister for Climate Action Eamon Ryan to take more and immediate action on climate change.

O'Connor will attend COP27 in Sharm El Sheikh.

Personal life
O'Connor was born in Skibbereen, Co. Cork, but currently resides in Glasgow.  They are autistic, transgender and non-binary.

References

2002 births
People from Cork (city)
Living people
Irish environmentalists
Irish transgender people
Irish non-binary people
Non-binary activists
People on the autism spectrum
Transgender non-binary people